Praxelis is a genus of flowering plants in the tribe Eupatorieae within the family Asteraceae.

 Species

References

Asteraceae genera
Eupatorieae